The following outline is provided as an overview of and topical guide to marketing:

Marketing – social and managerial processes by which products, services, and value are exchanged in order to fulfill individuals' or groups' needs and wants. These processes include, but are not limited to, advertising, promotion, distribution, and product management.

Core concepts in marketing
Marketers may sell goods or services directly to consumers, known as business to customer (B2C marketing); commercial organizations (known as business to business marketing or B2B), to government; to not-for-profit organizations (Not-for-profit organization (NFP)) or some combination of any of these.

Actors and relationships

 At the center of the marketing framework is the consumer lies the relationship between the consumer and the organization with the implication that marketers must manage the way the organization presents its public face.

 The consumer: Typically, the consumer refers to the end-user - but this may be an individual or group such as a household, family unit or organization. In addition, marketers may need to consider the roles of influencers such as Opinion leaders who increasingly use means such as social media to develop customer to customer networks of influence.

 The organization: may be represented by many different actors including: various sales personnel: Agent; Broker; Sales representative; Merchant; Retailer; Street vendor or Vendor

Selling situations & relationships: Depending on the nature of the business operations, many different types of actors are involved in a variety of selling situations involving a variety of sales personnel, who perform varied sales roles. Sales activities involve many different types of customer relationships - from simple transactional exchange through to long-term, enduring customer relationships.

Needs, wants and demands

Marketers typically begin planning with a detailed understanding of customer needs and wants. 
 A need is something required for a healthy life (e.g. food, water, shelter, emotional bonding); A want is a desire, wish or aspiration; When needs or wants are backed by purchasing power, they have the potential to become demands.

Nature of exchange
Exchange, the act of giving or taking one thing of value in return for another is central to marketing activities. Not all exchange involves Financial transactions, but may also involve barter, contra dealing or other form of trade. The object of exchange can include: Goods; services or experiences; concepts or ideas; causes and may even involve celebrity marketing

Perceptions of value

 Traditional thinking around the concept of value was that marketers created value through innovation, product design and manufacture and that Utility was embedded in products or services offered for sale. In this type of thinking, marketer's objective was to communicate a value proposition to potential buyers. However, recent thinking has changed the traditional perspective and now recognizes that consumers may participate in the co-creation of value in a variety of ways. Consumers may derive value through usage and experience, known as value-in-use or may be involved in product design, known as participatory design.

Foundation economic concepts
Given that marketing has its roots in economics, it shares many foundation concepts with that discipline. Most practicing marketers will have a working knowledge of basic economic concepts and theories.

Competitive advantages & comparative advantages
Businesses seek to compete by achieving competitive advantages or comparative advantages. Competitive advantages often focus on reducing costs through achieving one or more of the following: Economies of scope; Economies of scale; Experience effects; First-mover advantages. Alternatively a business may seek to develop uniqueness through product differentiation or developing unique competencies such as market sensing, rapid market response or delivering superior customer value.
superior value.

Competitiontypes
Different types of competitive markets can be identified: Duopoly; Monopoly; Monopolistic competition; Imperfect competition; Oligopoly

Demand
Understanding demand and supply is essential for determining market size and market potential as well as in the price-setting function.

 The basic mechanics of consumer demand include:  Demand curve; Demand-led growth; Demand response; Law of demand; Law of supply; Transaction costs.
 Different types of demand functions include: Derived demand; Inverse demand function.

Economic systems
In Western economies, the capitalist economy dominates. However, other types of economic systems such as barter economies and the Sharing economy can be identified.

Markets
Market
Monopsony
Oligopsony

Value
Value-in-ownership
Value-in-use

Marketing ethics

Switching

Switching costs
Switching barriers

Planning levels and planning tools

Planning levels 

Marketing planning is just one facet of the overall company's planning. Marketing plans must therefore take their guidance from the overall strategic plan or business plan. Most companies produce both a strategic plan and a managerial plan (also known as an operational plan). The distinction between strategic planning and management planning is that they are two phases with different goals.

 Strategic planning is fundamentally concerned with the policies that will improve the firm's competitive position. Strategic planning is sometimes called higher-order planning and is usually long-term planning (say 3–7 years) while management planning is short-term and may be carried out for a specific program (e.g. a sales or advertising campaign of a few weeks duration) or carried out annually. Strategic plans typically include a statement of the firm's vision and mission. The Marketing strategy is a plan that shows how the firm's marketing activities will help to achieve the overall strategic goals.

 Marketing management is focused on developing the marketing program or Marketing mix (also known as the 4Ps) and is concerned with the implementation of specific action plans designed to achieve objective, measurable targets (SMART objectives). Marketing management plans are typically prepared on an annual planning cycle, but may be prepared for shorter periods for special events such as a product launch, a new logo, change to corporate livery or a repositioning campaign.

Strategic planning tools and techniques

Strategic planning requires sophisticated research and analysis to document the firm's current situation as well as to identify opportunities with the potential to be developed.

Strategic research methods
Strategic research is primarily concerned with the identification of new business opportunities and threats, which derive from the external operating environment. Accordingly, strategic analysts rely less on traditional market research methods. Instead, they use methods such as: Environmental scanning; Marketing intelligence (also known as competitive intelligence) and Futures research

Strategic analysis methods

Marketers draw on a very wide variety of techniques and tools when analyzing the market and the broader operating conditions. The technique selected depends on the nature of the situation or problem to be investigated and the analyst's skill and experience. Strategic analysts employ some 200 different quantitative and qualitative analytical techniques including:

Brand Development Index (BDI); Category development index (CDI); Brand/ Category penetration; Benchmarking; Blind spot analysis; Functional capability and resource analysis; Impact analysis;  Counterfactual analysis; Demand analysis; Emerging Issues Analysis; Experience curve analysis; Gap analysis; impact analysis; se Analysis (also known as Porter's five forces analysis); Management profiling; Market segmentation analysis; Market share analysis; Market Segmentation analysis; Perceptual mapping; PEST analysis or its variants including PESTLE, STEEPLED and STEER; Portfolio analysis, such as BCG growth-share matrix or GE business screen matrix; Positioning analysis; Precursor Analysis or Evolutionary analysis; Product life cycle analysis and S-curve analysis (also known as technology life cycle or hype cycle analysis); Product evolutionary cycle analysis; Scenario analysis; Segment Share Analysis; Situation analysis; Strategic Group Analysis; SWOT analysis; Trend Analysis;  Value chain analysis

Marketing strategies 

 Barriers to entry
 Barriers to exit
 Market dominance strategies
 Porter's generic strategies
Cost leadership
Differentiation
 Mass customization
 Mission-driven marketing

Growth strategies 

 
 Aggressiveness strategies
 Ansoff Matrix (also known as the product/market growth matrix)
Market development
 Market penetration
 Product development
 Diversification (marketing strategy)
 Growth platforms
 Growth planning
 Horizontal integration
 Innovation
 Inorganic growth
 Mergers and acquisitions

 Organic growth
 Profit impact on marketing strategy
 Vertical integration

Marketing warfare strategies 

 Defensive strategy (marketing)
 Guerrilla marketing warfare strategies
 Guerrilla marketing (also known as Attack marketing)

Implementation and control 

Implementations  and control is an important feature of the planning process. From time to time, marketers will use appropriate measures of performance to gauge whether plans are achieving the desired results. If necessary, corrective action can be taken to get back on track.

Branches of Marketing 

The book titled, The Marketing Book, 7th ed., Routledge, Oxon, UK, 2016 edited by Michael J. Baker and Susan Hart identifies the distinct branches of marketing practice as:

 Consumer marketing (general Marketing)
 Business marketing; also known as Business-to-business marketing and Industrial marketing (which also includes Business-to-government marketing)
 Relationship marketing
 Environmental marketing; also known as Green marketing )
 International marketing; also known as Global marketing)
 Services marketing; which includes not-for-profit marketing and Destination marketing)
 Retailing 
 Social marketing (which includes  Cause-related marketing)

For a more detailed breakdown of the relevant topics for each of these key branches of marketing, see Branches of Marketing: Detailed Topics on this page. For special applications of marketing including marketing of specific types of products (e.g. agricultural marketing, faith based marketing, pharmaceutical marketing, political marketing, sports marketing, etc.,) or marketing to specific target groups (e.g. marketing to children, marketing to older people, LBGT marketing) see: Special applications of marketing practice).

Marketing orientations

Marketing orientations are the philosophies or mindsets that guide and shape marketing planning and marketing practice. Some marketing historians believe that different philosophies have informed marketing practice at different times in marketing's history. Although there is no real agreement amongst scholars about the precise nature or number of distinct marketing orientations, the most commonly cited include:

 Marketing orientation (See section: Marketing orientation)
 Marketing concept
 Production orientation (also see sections: Production orientation or Production orientation) 
Market-orientated; also known as the Selling orientation (also see sections: Selling orientation or Sales orientation)
 Societal marketing (also see section: Societal marketing)
Sustainable market orientation
Corporate social responsibility
 Relationship orientation  (also see Relationship orientation section)
 Customer relationship management

The marketing management framework

Marketing planning or the process of developing a marketing program requires a detailed understanding of the marketing framework including Consumer behavior; Market segmentation and Marketing research. In the process of understanding the consumer market to be served, marketers may need to consider such issues as:

Consumer basics

Brand awareness
Consumer
Consumerism
Customer knowledge
Consumer socialization
Consumer switching
Consumer purchase funnel
Customer engagement 
Demographics
Demographic profile
Ethical consumerism 
Lifestyle

Consumer decision-making

The main steps in the consumer's purchase decision process are:
Need or problem recognition → Information search → Evaluation of alternatives → Product/Brand Choice → Post purchase evaluation

AIDA (marketing)
Brand awareness
Consumer confusion
Choice Modelling
Decoy effect
Impulse purchases
Prospect theory
Window shopping

Influences on consumer decision-making

Consumers purchase decisions are influenced by a range of internal and external factors including:

Internal influences
Attitudes; Beliefs; Demographics; Aspirational age; Aspirational Brand; Culture; Learning; Motivation; Opinion leaders; Risk perception and Loss aversion; Needs; Social class; Values

External influences
Culture; Family; Reference groups; Subculture; Peer group; Pester power; Time

Market research and marketing research

Marketing research refers to research activities designed to understand the marketing environment, including competitors, the socio-cultural environment and the politico-legal operating environment. Market research specifically refers to research concerned with understanding the market, that is consumers and is designed to yield actionable customer insights.

Quantitative research methods 
Quantitative methods may also be known as Scientific methods.

Statistical surveys
Survey methodology
Experimental techniques
Exploratory research
Online panels
Quantitative research
Statistical survey
Questionnaire construction

Qualitative research methods

Computer-assisted qualitative data analysis software
Observational techniques
Eye tracking
Electroencephalograph
Functional magnetic resonance imaging
Ethnographic research
Neuromarketing
Focus group

Specific research tools and techniques

 Awareness research 
 Advertising research
Ad tracking
Measuring advertising effectiveness
 Concept testing
Behavioral economics
Competitive intelligence
Content analysis
Coolhunting
Conjoint analysis
Customer satisfaction research
Delphi technique
Forecasting
Predictive buying
Futures research
Marketing information systems
Marketing intelligence
Mixed method research
 Motivational research - no current article, but opportunity for a new article?
Nominal group technique
Psychometrics 
Innovation game
Service quality research

Scale/Questionnaire Design

Questionnaire construction
Scales
Likert scale
Semantic differential

Sampling 

 Simple random sampling
 Systematic sampling
 Statistical surveys
 Stratified sampling
 Cluster sampling
 Multistage sampling
 Nonprobability sampling

Market segmentation and targeting

List of abbreviations for market segments

Market segmentation 

Market segment (article)
Segmenting and positioning (article)
Market segmentation (section) or Market segmentation  or Market segmentation (section)
Mass customization
Mass marketing
Market segment
Microsegmention
Microsegment
Niche market
Hypersegmentation or one-to-one marketing
Precision marketing
Sub-niche market

Specific approaches to segmenting markets 

 (a) Segmenting consumer markets

The main bases for segmenting consumer markets include:

Demographics
Geodemographic segmentation (also known as Geo-targeting or Geodemography)
Intermarket segmentation (for segmenting international markets)
Psychographics (psychometric segmentation; lifestyle and values segmentation) (article) (also see: Psychographic segmentation -article)
Sagacity segmentation
 List of abbreviations for frequently used consumer segments

(b) Segmenting business or industrial markets
The main bases for segmenting business or industrial markets include:

Industrial market segmentation
Firmographics
Industry classification

Measuring market segment size 
Bass diffusion model
Serviceable available market
Total addressable market

Targeting 

Targeting (section) 
 Attitudinal targeting
 Behavioral targeting
 Demographic profile
 Demographic targeting
 Geo-targeting
 Niche market
 Targeted advertising
 Target audience
 Persona (user experience)
 Serviceable available market
 Total addressable market

Proprietary segmentation databases and software 

To support, market segmentation analysis marketers may require access to databases with large sample sizes. A number of commercial companies provide such data which typically includes proprietary software designed to interrogate the data and backed by algorithms that support different types of segmentation approaches. These commercial databases are often country or region specifically.
Popular geo-demographic segmentation databases include:
 Acorn (UK)
 Claritas Prizm (US)
 Experian (Europe, US)
 Mosaic (Asia-Pacific)

Popular psychometric tools include:
 Roy Morgan Research (Asia Pacific)
 VALS (US)
 Values Modes

Statistical techniques used in segmentation analysis

 Neural Networks
 CHAID (Chi-square Automatic Interaction Detector)
 Canonical Analysis
 Choice Modelling
 Cluster analysis
 Conjoint analysis
 Cross tab
 Discriminant analysis
 Factor analysis
 Intent scale translation
 K-means
 Latent Class Analysis
 Logit analysis
 Multi dimensional scaling
 Preference-rank translation
 Preference regression
 Random Forests
 Structural Equation Modeling

Marketing management: The marketing program (also known as the marketing mix or the 4 Ps)

The marketing program, also known as the marketing mix or the 4 ps consists of the product, price, place and promotion.

Product 

Badge engineering
Cannibalization (marketing)
Euro Car Segment
Market cannibalism
Market segmentation index
Positioning (marketing)
Packaging and labeling
Food labelling regulations
Labelling
Country of origin
Reusable packaging
Seasonal packaging 
Wine label
Premium product segment 
Product lifecycle
Product life-cycle theory
Product lining
Product line extension
Product category volume
Product churning
Product differentiation
Product life cycle management (article)
Product life-cycle management (marketing) (article)
Technology lifecycle
Life cycle cost analysis
Planned obsolescence
Product line
Product proliferation
Whole product
Product portfolio
 B.C.G. Analysis
 G.E. Multi Factoral analysis
Contribution margin analysis
Product bundling
Utility

New product development (NPD)

Innovation and New product development are an important part of a firm's long term growth strategy.

The steps in a basic new production development process are:

Idea generation (or Ideation (creative process)) →Concept screening→ Concept testing → Business analysis → Product development → Market testing → Commercialization and may include a Soft launch

The NPD process can be applied to:

Products: New product development; Design
Services: Service innovation; Service design
Environmental goods or services: Eco-innovation; Ecodesign; Lean product development

A recent trend in NPD is the use of participatory design, also known as co-design or co-operative design, which involves stakeholders such as employees or consumers in the design process.

Sources of new product ideas include: Research and development; Consumers or Users; distributors, suppliers or crowdsourcing.

Types of innovation
Blue Ocean Strategy
Disruptive innovation

NPD represents a high risk activity. It requires substantial investment and a list of product failures suggests that the probability of failure is relatively high.

New product adoption and diffusion

In order to develop a superior understanding of how new products are adopted by the market place and the factors that influence adoption rates, marketers often turn to a number of models or theories of the adoption/diffusion process:

Bass diffusion model
Diffusion (article)
Diffusion of innovations (article)
Early adopter 
Hype cycle
Technology acceptance model (article)
Technology adoption life cycle (article)
Technology life cycle
Quality function deployment
Crossing the Chasm (Book title)

Legal protection of new products and brands

New product development, including the design of product features, manufacturing processes, packaging design etc. involves creative work and therefore constitutes intellectual property. A number of different legal avenues are available to protect different types of intellectual property.

Certification mark
Copyright
List of Copyright Acts
Logo
Patent
Service mark
 Service mark symbol
Trademark
Sound trademark
Trade secret

Brand management 

Branding (Promotional)
Branding
Aspirational brand
Celebrity branding
Co-branding
Employer branding
Green brands
Internet branding
Ingredient branding
Lifestyle brand
Nation branding
Symbol-intensive brand
White-label product
Brand architecture
Brand asset management
Brand alliances
Brand ambassador
Brand aversion
Brand awareness
Brand community
Brand equity
Brand experience
Brand extension (also known as brand stretching)
Brand implementation
Brand language
Brand loyalty
Brand naming
Brand orientation
Brand preference
Brand relationship
Brand strength analysis
Brand tribalism
Challenger brand
Brand switching
Corporate identity
Corporate branding
Cult brand
Generic brand
Hallmarks
Silver hallmarks
List of fictional brands
List of renamed brands
Product proliferation
Marque
Rebranding
Self-brand
Visual brand language

Branding strategies

 Private brand (also known as Private labels or Store brand
 Private Label Strategy
 Brand licensing
 Corporate branding
 Family branding
 Fighter brand (also known as a fighting brand)
 Individual branding
 National brand
 Umbrella brand

Brand protection

 Copyright
 Service mark
 Trademark
 Genericized trademark

Packaging and labelling 

 Mandatory labelling
 Sustainable packaging

Price 

 Algorithmic pricing
Barter
Choice Modelling
Competitor indexing
Break even analysis
Markup
Loyalty card
Operating margin
Price elasticity of demand
Pricing objectives
Price points
Price ceiling
Price controls
Price fixing
Price fixing cases
Price floor
Price gouging
Price mechanism
Price signal
Price system
Price umbrella
Purchasing power
Real prices and ideal prices
Reservation price
Resale price maintenance
Shadow price
Switching costs
Target pricing
Transfer pricing
Pricing science
Price override
Unit price

Pricing strategies

 Value-based pricing
 Relationship-oriented pricing
 Cost-plus pricing
 Cost-plus pricing with elasticity considerations
 Rate of return pricing
 Pricing for profit maximization

Pricing tactics

Base point pricing
Cost the limit of price
Bait pricing
Break-even (economics)
Congestion pricing
Contingency pricing
Clearance sale
Discounts and allowances
Drip pricing
Dumping (pricing policy)
Everyday low price
Fire sale
Geographic pricing
High–low pricing
Loss leader
Parity pricing:
Export parity price
Import parity price
Penetration pricing
Premium pricing (also known as Price premium)
Price wars
Joint product pricing
Psychological pricing
Premium pricing
Price discrimination
Dynamic pricing
Time-based pricing
Geographical pricing and price zoning
Value pricing or Value-based purchasing
Price skimming
Odd price
Sliding scale fees
Two part tariff
 Variable pricing and real-time pricing
Penetration pricing
Variable pricing
Willingness to pay
Yield management

Place (distribution) 

 Direct marketing
 Database marketing
 Direct Marketing Association
 Drop shipping
 Jobber (merchandising)
Fuel jobber
Rack Jobber
Jobbing house
Stockjobber
 Logistics
 Green logistics
 Logistic engineering
 Reverse logistics
 Marketing channel
Marketing channels
Sales (also known as Personal selling)
Sales management (also known as Sales force management)
Sales effectiveness
Sales force management system
Sales techniques
 Negotiation
 Shill
  Large Group Awareness Training (LGAT)
 Salesman
 Supply chain
 Supply chain management
 Wholesale
 Wholesaler
 Value chain
 Value migration

The following methods are prohibited in most nations:
 Multi-level marketing
 Pyramid scheme

Promotion (also known as marketing communications or integrated marketing communications (IMC))

Marketing communications (section)
Advertising agency or marketing communications agency
Cross-promotion
Communication planning
Co-promotion
Internal marketing
Influencer marketing
Positioning
Referral marketing
Street marketing
Street team
Unique selling proposition
Viral marketing
Word of mouth marketing

Elements of the promotional mix

Advertising

Ad blocking
Advertising management
Advertising campaign
Account planning
Advertising media selection
Advertising slogan
Attention (advertising)
Augmented reality advertising
Commercial skipping
Consumer-generated advertising
Digital marketing
Effective frequency
History of advertising
Immersive advertising
Infomercial
In-game advertising
Innovation
Interactive advertising
Native advertising
Perceptual blindness
Persona
Shock advertising
Storyboard
Targeted advertising
Target audience
Television commercial
Reach (advertising)
View-through rate

Advertising models: How does advertising work?

AIDA (marketing)
AISDALSLove
DAGMAR marketing
Elaboration likelihood model (article)
Elaboration likelihood model (section)

Advertising research

Advertising research (Article with a media focus)
Ad tracking
AttentionTracking
Copy testing
Eye tracking

Advertising Media
Audience measurement
Advertising board
Advertising postcard
Cinema
Display stand
Interactive media
Internet
Magazines
List of magazines by circulation
Mass media
Media planning
New media
Newspapers
Newspaper circulation
Lists of newspapers
Nielsen Media Research
Out-of-home advertising
Aerial advertising
Billboard (advertising)
Digital billboard
Human billboard
Mobile billboard
Neon message board
Sandwich board
 Kiosk
 Interactive kiosks
Transit media
Bus advertising
Driven media
Fleet media
Truckside advertisement
Wrap advertising
Signage
 Electronic signage
 Digital signage
Skywriting
Product placement
Radio
List of most-listened-to radio programs
Nielsen ratings
Nielsen Audio
 Retail media
Social media marketing
Streaming media
Television
List of most watched television broadcasts
OzTAM
Q Score
Television ratings

Award-winning advertising campaigns
Share a Coke
Coca-Cola's Hillsong campaign
Slip-Slop-Slap (Anti-Cancer Institute of Australia) Winner of the International Sulzberger Award, 2010

Internet 

 Affiliate marketing
 Banner blindness
 Behavioral Targeting
 Mobile advertising
 Online advertising
 Performance-based advertising
 Search analytics
 Search engine optimization
 Social media marketing
 Referral marketing
 Revenue sharing
 Web analytics

Main types of internet promotion E-mail spam, e-mail marketing, post-click marketing, Website monetizing, Search engine marketing (SEM), search engine optimization (SEO), Display advertising, * Contextual advertising
Internet advertising methods Advertising methods: Ad filtering, ad serving, central ad server, pop-up ad, contextual advertising, web banner
Search engine marketing payment methods  pay per click, click fraud, paid inclusion
Internet metrics Click through rate (CTR), cost per action (CPA), cost per click (CPC), cost per impression (CPI), cost per mille (CPM), effective cost per mille (eCPM)

Advertainment

Advergaming
Branded content (also known as Branded entertainment) 
In-game advertising
Product placement

Direct and digital marketing

Direct response television
Direct response media
Digital marketing (also known as Digital promotion
E-commerce
Email production
Telemarketing
Specialty catalogs

Personal selling 

AIDA (marketing)
DAGMAR marketing
Field marketing
Sales management
Sales effectiveness
 Sales process
Smarketing
Lead generation
Presentation
Closing (sales)
 Customer relationship management
 Customer lifecycle management

Sales promotion

Gimmick
Merchandising
Branding (Promotional)
Promotional campaign
Point of sale
Point of sale display

Public relations

Buzz marketing
Buzz monitoring
Corporate image
Corporate communications
Cause marketing
Content marketing
Doing a Ratner
Event marketing
Exhibitions
Speechwriter
Trade fairs
Undercover marketing
Viral marketing
Word of mouth and buzz

Sponsorship

 Ambush marketing
 Community marketing

Communications planning

 Kelman's source characteristics

Measuring communications effects 

Audience response
Effective frequency
Mind share
Reach (advertising)
Share of voice
Share of wallet

The extended marketing mix 
The extended marketing mix is used in the marketing of services, ideas and customer experiences and typically refers to a model of 7 Ps and includes the original 4 Ps plus process, physical evidence and people. Some texts use a model of 8 Ps and include performance level (service quality) as an 8th P.

Process

Customer experience management
Service blueprint

Physical evidence 

Virtual customer environment
Front of house
Front office
Service innovation
Service design
Servicescapes

People 

Customer
Customer to customer
Dramaturgical perspective
Personnel
Pink-collar worker
 Customer interface
 CEM integration
 CEM organization
Role theory
Scripts

Measuring marketing performance: Marketing metrics

Marketing activities are costly and represent an investment in a company or brand's long term future. With the increased emphasis on accountability, marketers must consider how they measure marketing's performance and communicate that to stakeholders. Various types of metrics that are in widespread use may be classified as:

Measures of market/ competitive performance
 Market share
 Market share analysis
 Market value
 Market power
 Marketing Effectiveness
 Return on marketing investment (ROMI)
 Share of wallet

Measures of advertising and promotional effectiveness
 Measuring advertising effectiveness
 Share of voice

Measures of brand health
 Brand equity
 Brand valuation
 Return on Marketing Investment (ROMI)

Customer-oriented measures
 Customer satisfaction
 Customer satisfaction research
 Customer data management
 Customer analytics

Special topics in marketing 

 Consumer Culture Theory (CCT)
 Customer privacy
 Consumer behavior and ideals of beauty
 Diversity marketing
 Remarketing with Iranian Style
 Family in advertising
 Effects of advertising on teen body image
 Marketing paradigms
 Marketing myopia
 Network marketing
 Postmodern marketing
 Sex in advertising
 Subliminal advertising
 Subvertising

Branches of Marketing: Detailed topics

Business Marketing

Affiliate marketing
Affinity marketing
Co-marketing
Firmographics
Managed services
Outsourcing
Personal selling
Prospecting
Solution selling
Sales
Supply chain management
Vendor lock-in

Environmental marketing

 Green marketing

International marketing

 Intermarket segmentation
 Global marketing
 Market entry strategies
 Product adaptation

Relationship marketing

 Customer relationship management
 ECRM - Electronic customer relationship management
 Customer lifetime value
Customer lifetime valuation
 Customer lifecycle management
 Loyalty marketing
Customer loyalty programs
Incentive program
Loyalty program
 Trust-based marketing

Services Marketing

Customer service
Customer Service System
Destination marketing
Self-service
Service quality
SERVQUAL
Customer satisfaction
Customer satisfaction research
Disconfirmed expectancy
Quality management
Servicescapes
 Service
 Service blueprint
 Borderless Selling
 Quality
 Service quality (aka PZB model or gaps model)
 Experience economy
 Service design
 Service-dominant logic
 Service innovation
 Service mark
 Servicescapes
 Service sector
 Service recovery
 Service system
 Service recovery paradox
 Sports marketing
 Strategic service management

Social marketing

Corporate social responsibility
Cause-related marketing
 Cause-related loyalty marketing
Cradle to grave sustainability practices
Green marketing
Green brands
Socially responsible marketing
Societal marketing
Sustainability marketing
Sustainability brand
Sustainable packaging
Sustainability metrics and indices

Retailing 

E-tailing
Point of sales
Retail concentration
Retail design
Retail software
Retail media
Site selection
Shopper marketing
Store manager
Visual merchandising

Types of retailer

 Arabber
 Bazaari
 Costermonger
 Hawker (trade)
 Huckster
 Merchant
 Peddler
 Street vendor

Types of retail outlet and shopping precincts

Arcade
Automated retail
Bazaar
Bedesten
Haat bazaar
Meena Bazaar
Landa bazaar
Saddar Bazaar
Big-box store
Category killer
Chain store
Charity shop
Convenience store
Department store
List of department stores
Discount store
Dollar store
Hypermarket
Franchising
Market town
Market
Wet market
Pasar malam
Pasar pagi
Pawnbroker
Pop-up retail
Retailers' cooperative
Shopping mall
Shopping streets
Second-hand shop
 Self-service
Supermarket
List of supermarkets
Strip mall
Souq (or souk is an Arabic term for bazaar or market)
Variety store
Vending machine
Warehouse club
Warehouse store

Special applications of marketing and promotion 

Advertising and marketing to children
Adolescents and food marketing
Agricultural marketing
Agricultural value chain
Alcohol advertising
Business-to-government marketing
Cause marketing
Cross merchandising
City marketing
Cosmetics advertising
Community marketing
Destination marketing
Destination marketing organization
Evangelism marketing
Engagement marketing
Faith-based marketing
Fish marketing
Fast food advertising
Food marketing
Grey market
Health marketing
LGBT marketing
Local store or neighbourhood marketing
Megamarketing
Marketing of Halo 3
Movement marketing
Pharmaceutical marketing
Political advertising campaign
Shrimp marketing
Sports marketing
Tobacco advertising
Tourist attractions
Wholesale marketing of food

History 

 History of advertising (section)
 History of advertising (main page)
 History of advertising in Britain article
 History of branding (section)
 History of brand management (section)
 History of marketing research (section)
 History of market segmentation (section)
 History of promotional merchandise (section)
 History of retail (section)
 History of merchants (section)
 History of the market place (section)
 Origins of the positioning concept (section)
 Origins of consumer behaviour (section)

Influential marketing thinkers 

 Wroe Alderson (1898-1965) - proponent of marketing science; instrumental in developing the functional school of marketing and in the managerial approach to marketing
 Igor Ansoff (1918-2002) - marketing/ management strategist; noted for the product/market growth matrix
 David Aaker - highly awarded educator and author in the area of marketing and organisational theory
 N.W. Ayer - probably the first advertiser to use mass media (i.e. telegraph) in a promotional campaign and early proponent of media scheduling 
 Leonard Berry (professor) (1942- ) - author and educator with strong interest in health marketing and relationship marketing
 Neil H. Borden (1922-1962) - coined the term, 'marketing mix'; former President of the American Marketing Association
 Clayton Christensen - educator, author and consultant, published in the areas of innovation and entrepreneurship
 George S. Day - author and educator; has published in the area of strategic marketing
 Ernest Dichter (1907-1991) - market researcher, consumer behaviourist, pioneer of motivational research methods
 Andrew S. C. Ehrenberg (1926-2010) - made contributions to the methodology of data collection, analysis and presentation, and an understanding buyer behaviour and how advertising works
 Edward Filene (1860-1937)  - early pioneer of modern retailing methods
 Seth Godin - popular author, entrepreneur, public speaker and marketer
 Paul E. Green (1927-2012) - academic and author; the founder of conjoint analysis and popularised the use of multidimensional scaling, clustering, and analysis of qualitative data in marketing. 
 Shelby D. Hunt (1939- ) -former editor of the Journal of Marketing and organisational theorist noted for his contributions to RA theory
 John E. Jeuck (1916-2009) - early marketing educator 
 Philip Kotler (1931-) - popularised the managerial approach to marketing; prolific author
 E. St. Elmo Lewis (1872–1948) - developed the AIDA model used in sales and advertising
 Christopher Lovelock (1940-2008) - author of many books and articles on services marketing
 Theodore Levitt (1925-2006) - former editor of Harvard Business Review, prolific author of marketing articles and famed for his article, "Marketing Myopia"
 E. Jerome McCarthy - popularised the managerial approach to marketing; developed the concept of the 4Ps (i.e. the 'marketing mix' or marketing program)
 Arthur Nielsen (1897–1980) - early market researcher; pioneered methods for estimating radio and TV audiences and ratings
 David Ogilvy (1911-1999)- advertising guru, early pioneer of the market positioning concept
 Vance Packard - journalist and author, wrote The Hidden Persuaders (1957) which explored the use of motivational research in marketing practice
 Charles Coolidge Parlin(1872-1942) - pioneer of market and advertising research methods
 Rosser Reeves (1910-1984)- advertising guru; advocate of frequency in media schedules
 Al Ries - advertising executive, author and credited with coining the term, 'positioning' in the late 1960s
 Arch Wilkinson Shaw (1876-1962) - early management theorist, proponent of the scientific approach to marketing
 Henry Charles Taylor (1873-1969) - the agricultural marketer
 Richard S. Tedlow - author and educator; published in the area of marketing history
 James Walter Thompson (1847-1928) - founded one of the earliest modern advertising agencies, J Walter Thompson; a very early proponent of using brand image in advertising
 Jack Trout - together with Al Ries, popularised the positioning concept
 Don E. Schultz - father of 'integrated marketing communications' (IMC)
 Stephen Vargo- together with R.F. Lusch developed the Service-dominant logic approach to marketing
 Henry Grady Weaver (1889-1949) - developed the survey questionnaire for use in market research
 Jerry (Yoram) Wind - former editor of the Journal of Marketing, educator and marketer
 Byron Sharp - N.Z. academic; one of the first to document buyer loyalty in empirical work
 Daniel Starch (1883–1979) - psychologist and marketing researcher, developed the so-called Starch scores to measure impact of magazine advertising; Starch scores are still in use
 Gerald Zaltman - developed the Metaphor Elicitation Technique (ZMET)
 Valarie Zeithaml - together with A. Parasurman and L.L. Berry, developed the model of service quality and the SERVQUAL research instrument

Trade magazines and academic journals

Advertising Age
Adweek
Brandweek
International Journal of Bank Marketing
Journal of Personal Selling & Sales Management
Inside Retailing (Australia)
International Journal of Research in Marketing
Journal of Creative Communications
Journal of Consumer Research
Journal of Marketing Research
Journal of Marketing
Journal of Marketing Education
Journal of Service Research
Journal of Vacation Marketing
Marketing (magazine) 
 Marketing (United  Kingdom)
Marketing Science (journal)
Marketing Theory
Marketing Week
The Marketer U.K. (defunct)
MediaWeek
PRWeek United Kingdom
Sales Promotion (magazine)
Social Marketing Quarterly
Sponsor Magazine

Marketing & advertising associations, societies and peak industry associations

 American Marketing Association
 Arts Marketing Association
 Association of National Advertisers
 Australian Market and Social Research Society Limited
 Canadian Marketing Association
 Construction Marketing Association
 Direct marketing association
 Direct Marketing Association (UK)
 Direct Marketing Association (USA)
 Direct Marketing Association (South Africa)
 Direct Selling Association
 European Marketing Research Centre
 European Sponsorship Association
 Marketing Research Association
 Market Research Society
 Potato Marketing Corporation of Western Australia
 Produce Marketing Association
 Promotion Marketing Association

Archives, museums and galleries (dedicated to marketing and/or advertising)

American Advertising Museum
Museum of Brands, Packaging & Advertising, Notting Hill, London
Musée de la Publicité
The Advertising Archives
William F. Eisner Museum of Advertising & Design, Milwaukee, Wisconsin

Lists and outlines

Marketing education
History of marketing thought and education
Escola Superior de Propaganda e Marketing, Brazil (School of Advertising & Marketing)
Master of Business Administration
Master of Marketing Research
Bachelor of Business
Bachelor of Business Administration
Bachelor of Pharmaceutical Marketing and Management Philadelphia College of Pharmacy and Science

References

External links 

Marketing dictionary

Marketing
Marketing
Marketing topics
 Outline